ViX is an over-the-top streaming service owned and operated by TelevisaUnivision. The service primarily shows content from TelevisaUnivision and other third-party content providers, including television series, movies, and sports programming. Originally launched as PrendeTV on 30 March 2021, the service was expanded and rebranded as ViX on 31 March 2022.

History
On January 13, 2021, Univision said that PrendeTV would be launched in the first quarter of 2021. On March 30, 2021, Univision launched their ad-supported streaming service. On May 3, 2021, Univision announced that it had acquired the television rights for Euro 2020 for PrendeTV and TUDN and Univision also acquired rights for Brazilian and Argentine leagues. TelevisaUnivision will launch a new streaming service by bringing together PrendeTV, ViX, Univision Now, and Blim TV under one name in 2022. The premium tier, ViX+, which includes premium series & films, along with live sporting events, including FIFA World Cup Qatar 2022 for Mexican audiences, launched on July 21, 2022.

Programing
ViX's programing includes classic TV, documentaries, television series, films, and sports programming and telenovelas from Televisa's telenovela library.

Original programming

Drama

Comedy

Unscripted

Docuseries

Reality

Co-productions 
These programs have been commissioned by Vix in cooperation with a partner network.

Exclusive international distribution 
These programs, even though ViX has announced them as ViX+ Originals, are programs that have been aired in different countries, and ViX has bought exclusive distribution rights to stream them in other various countries. They may be available on ViX in their home territory and other markets where ViX does not have the first run license, without the ViX Original label, some time after their first-run airing on their original broadcaster.

Original films

Exclusive international distribution films 
These products, even though Vix lists them as ViX Originals, are films that have been released in different countries, and ViX has bought exclusive distribution rights to stream them in other various countries. They may be available on ViX in their home territory and other markets where ViX does not have the first run license, without the ViX Original label.

Sports programming 
ViX also carries sports programming, in conjunction with TUDN.

The service has picked up other domestic football events as well, including the Argentine Primera División, Brasileirão, Peru's Primera División and Colombia's Categoría Primera A for the United States.

Current broadcasting rights

Mexico

United States

Notes

References

External links
 

Internet television streaming services